On 7 November 2021, a collapse at an artisanal gold mine in Niger killed at least 32 miners. The mine is located in the impoverished Maradi Region.

Disaster 
Adamou Gueraou, mayor of Dan-Issa district told Agence France-Presse “The provisional death toll is 18 people, whom we buried this morning". Seven other miners were hospitalised with injuries.

See also 
Samira Hill Gold Mine

References 

2021 disasters in Niger
Gold mine collapse
2021 mining disasters
Gold mining disasters
Mining disasters in Niger
gold collapse
November 2021 events in Africa